Abortion in Michigan is legal beyond fetal viability. A state constitutional amendment to explicitly guarantee abortion rights was placed on the ballot in 2022 as Michigan Proposal 22–3; it passed by 57 percent, adding the right to abortion and contraceptive use to the Michigan Constitution. The amendment largely prevents the regulation of abortion before fetal viability, unless said regulations are to protect the individual seeking an abortion, and it also makes it unconstitutional to make laws restricting abortions which would protect the life and health, physical and/or mental, of the pregnant individual seeking abortion.

A 1931 law criminalized abortion except when the mother's life was in danger, and the U.S. Supreme Court ruling in Dobbs v. Jackson Women's Health Organization would have allowed that law to go back into effect, but on September 7, 2022, a Michigan Court of Claims judge ruled that that law violated the Michigan constitution. The law is now ultimately null due to the 2022 amendment.

History

Legislative history 
By the end of the 1800s, all states in the Union except Louisiana had therapeutic exceptions in their legislative bans on abortions. In the 19th century, bans by state legislatures on abortion were about protecting the life of the mother given the number of deaths caused by abortions; state governments saw themselves as looking out for the lives of their citizens. In 1932, a law was passed that made abortion illegal in the state.

In 2006, the parents of Becky Bell, a girl whose death was related to the existence of parental consent rules, testified before the Michigan House of Representatives in opposition to a pending parental consent law. The state was one of 23 states in 2007 to have a detailed abortion-specific informed consent requirement. Michigan was the only state with a detailed informed consent statue that provided women seeking abortions on the state website with information about pregnancy relative to how far along the woman is. Georgia, Michigan, Arkansas and Idaho all required in 2007 that women must be provided by an abortion clinic with the option to view an image their fetus if an ultrasound is used prior to the abortion taking place. Michigan was the only state of the 23 with written informed consent materials that did not require abortion providers to give patients information about abortion alternatives.

In 2013, state Targeted Regulation of Abortion Providers (TRAP) law applied to medication induced abortions in addition to abortion clinics. The state legislature was one of ten states nationwide that tried to unsuccessfully pass a fetal heartbeat bill in 2018.  Only Iowa successfully passed such a bill, but it was struck down by the courts.

In May 2019, the Republican dominated state Legislature passed HB 4320-4321 and SB 229-230 which banned dilation and evacuation abortions.  They specified criminal sentences of two years for anyone who performed this type of abortion procedure. The legislation passed 22–16 in the Senate and 58–51 in the House. Michigan Governor Gretchen Whitmer promised to veto the legislation and any similar legislation attempting to ban abortions in the state. As of May 14, 2019, the state prohibited abortions after the fetus was viable, generally some point between week 24 and 28.  This period uses a standard defined by the US Supreme Court in 1973 with the  Roe v. Wade ruling.

In 2022, an activist group called Reproductive Freedom for All started a ballot initiative, which sought to enshrine the right to abortion, among other pregnancy related matters, in the Michigan Constitution. On July 11, 753,759 signatures were submitted to get the proposed amendment on the ballot in the November general election. The signatures were verified by the Bureau of Elections who recommended that it be included on the ballot, but the Board of State Canvassers deadlocked along party lines, preventing the initiative from moving forward. The Republican members of the board claimed the initiative to be invalid due to formatting errors. The matter was appealed to the Michigan Supreme Court. On September 8, the state supreme court ruled in favor of the ballot initiative, and on the following day, a meeting of the Board of State Canvassers unanimously certified the initiative.  The proposal was passed 57% to 43%, adding the right to abortion and contraceptive use to the Michigan constitution.

Judicial history 
The US Supreme Court's decision in 1973's Roe v. Wade ruling meant the state could no longer regulate abortion in the first trimester. However, the Supreme Court overturned Roe v. Wade in Dobbs v. Jackson Women's Health Organization,  later in 2022.

On September 7, 2022, Judge Elizabeth Gleicher invalidated a law from 1931 that criminalized abortion in Michigan unless the mother's life was in danger. From the ruling:

“A law denying safe, routine medical care not only denies women of their ability to control their bodies and their lives — it denies them of their dignity... Michigan’s Constitution forbids this violation of due process.”  it "...forces a pregnant woman to forgo her reproductive choices and to instead serve as `an involuntary vessel entitled to no more respect than other forms of collectively owned property,’”

Judge Gleicher had previously issued an injunction of the 1931 law in May 2022; the Michigan Court of Appeals later ruled that it only applied to state prosecutors, but not county prosecutors. Gleicher's September 2022 decision applies to both sets of prosecutors.

Clinic history 

Between 1982 and 1992, the number of abortion clinics in the state decreased by thirteen, going from 83 in 1982 to 70 in 1992. In 2014, there were twenty abortion clinics in the state. In 2014, 89% of the counties in the state did not have an abortion clinic. That year, 40% of women in the state aged 15–44 lived in a county without an abortion clinic. In March 2016, there were 21 Planned Parenthood clinics in the state. In 2017, there were 19 Planned Parenthood clinics, 8 of which offered abortion services, in a state with a population of 2,209,248 women aged 15–49 .

Amendment text

Statistics 

Between 1893 and 1932, there were 156 indictments and 40 convictions of women for having abortions. In 1990, 1,157,000 women in the state faced the risk of an unintended pregnancy. In 2010, the state had seven publicly funded abortions, of which were seven federally funded and zero were state funded. In 2013, among white women aged 15–19, there were 1,460 abortions, 1,700 abortions for black women aged 15–19, 130 abortions for Hispanic women aged 15–19, and 90 abortions for women of all other races. In 2014, 54% of adults said in a poll by the Pew Research Center that abortion should be legal in all or most cases while 42% believe it should be illegal in all or most cases. In 2017, the state had an infant mortality rate of 6.8 deaths per 1,000 live births. In 2017, there were 1,777 dilation and evacuation procedures among the 26,594 total abortions performed in Michigan that year.

Illegal and unsafe abortion deaths 
In the period between 1972 and 1974, the state had an illegal abortion mortality rate per million women aged 15–44 of between 0.1 and 0.9. In 2005, the Detroit News reported that a 16-year-old boy beat his pregnant, under-age girlfriend with a bat at her request to abort a fetus. The young couple lived in Michigan, where parental consent is required to receive an abortion.

Pro-Abortion views and activities

Views 
Sen. Winnie Brinks (D-Grand Rapids) said during a hearing on the 2019 proposed abortion legislation, "Nearly 99% of abortions occur before 21 weeks, but when they are needed later in pregnancy, it is often in very complex circumstances, the kinds of situations where a woman and her doctor need every medical option available. [...] In fact, abortions later in pregnancy often involve rare, severe fetal abnormalities, and serious risks to women's health." Sen. Erika Geiss (D-Taylor) said during the same debate, "I can stand here and call out the hypocrisy of predominantly male legislators — most of whom, with zero medical background — who somehow decided when they took office that they are medical experts and experts of women's bodies and health care."

Protests 
Women from the state participated in marches supporting abortion rights as part of a #StoptheBans movement in May 2019.

Violence 

A 74 year old man shot a 84 year old woman on September 20, 2022. She was campaigning against Michigan's Proposition 3 which sought to make abortion a constitutional right in the state of Michigan. She survived and she received medical treatment for her wound after driving to a nearby police department. The man claimed he accidentally shot her. Prosecutors from Ionia County later charged him on September 30 with one count of felonious assault, careless discharge of a gun causing injury and reckless use of a firearm. He has been released on $10,000 bond.

The pro-abortion militant group Jane's Revenge has accepted responsibility for acts of vandalism aimed at anti-abortion crisis pregnancy centers. The organization has been linked with vandalization on the building which hosts Jackson Right to Life and the office of Congressman Tim Walberg. Other acts of vandalism in Michigan have been suspected to have the involvement of Jane's Revenge, such as vandalization of the Lennon Pregnancy Center in Dearborn Heights on June 23, 2022, the pregnancy center Pregnancy Aid Detroit in Eastpointe on December 19, 2022, as well as the home of one of the board members the same day.

Anti-abortion activities and views

Views 
The Democrats for Life of America are a group of anti-abortion Democrats on the political left who advocate for an anti-abortion plank in the Democratic Party's platform and for anti-abortion Democratic candidates.  Former vice-presidential candidate Sargent Shriver, the late Robert Casey, a former two-term governor of Pennsylvania, and former Rep. Bart Stupak (D-Mich), a former leader of the bipartisan anti-abortion caucus in the United States House of Representatives, have been among the most well-known anti-abortion Democrats. However, following his vote in favor of the Patient Protection and Affordable Care Act, Marjorie Dannenfelser of the SBA List reported that her organization was revoking an anti-abortion award it had been planning to give to Stupak, and anti-abortion organizations accused Stupak of having betrayed the anti-abortion movement.

Violence 
There was an arson attack at an abortion clinic in 1981 in Michigan that caused US$57,000 in damage. On September 11, 2006, David McMenemy of Rochester Hills, Michigan, crashed his car into the Edgerton Women's Care Center in Davenport, Iowa. He then doused the lobby in gasoline and started a fire. McMenemy committed these acts in the belief that the center was performing abortions; however, Edgerton is not an abortion clinic. Time magazine listed the incident in a "Top 10 Inept Terrorist Plots" list.

References 

Michigan
Healthcare in Michigan
Women in Michigan